The following is a list of the U.S. state of West Virginia's state agencies.

Departments and agencies 
West Virginia Department of Administration
West Virginia Department of Agriculture
West Virginia Department of Commerce
West Virginia Division of Forestry
West Virginia Division of Labor
West Virginia Division of Natural Resources
West Virginia Geological and Economic Survey
West Virginia Office of Miners' Health, Safety and Training
West Virginia Water Development Authority
WORKFORCE West Virginia
West Virginia Department of Economic Development
West Virginia Department of Education
West Virginia Board of Education
West Virginia Higher Education Policy Commission
West Virginia Council for Community and Technical College Education
West Virginia Department of Education and the Arts
West Virginia Division of Culture and History
West Virginia Division of Rehabilitation Services
West Virginia Department of Environmental Protection
West Virginia Division of Air Quality
West Virginia Division of Land Restoration
West Virginia Division of Mining and Reclamation
West Virginia Division of Water and Waste Management
West Virginia Office of Abandoned Mine Lands and Reclamation
West Virginia Office of Environmental Advocate
West Virginia Office of Environmental Enforcement
West Virginia Office of Environmental Remediation
West Virginia Office of Explosives and Blasting
West Virginia Office of Oil and Gas
West Virginia Department of Health and Human Resources
West Virginia Board of Medicine
West Virginia Bureau for Behavioral Health and Health Facilities
West Virginia Bureau for Child Support Enforcement
West Virginia Bureau for Children and Families
West Virginia Bureau for Medical Services
West Virginia Bureau for Public Health
West Virginia Office of Community and Rural Health Services
West Virginia Office of Emergency Medical Services
West Virginia Office of Environmental Health Services
West Virginia Office of Nutrition Services
West Virginia Department of Homeland Security 
West Virginia Division of Corrections and Rehabilitation
West Virginia Division of Emergency Management
West Virginia Division of Juvenile Services
West Virginia State Police
 West Virginia Department of Veterans Assistance
West Virginia Department of Revenue
West Virginia Alcohol Beverage Control Administration
West Virginia Athletic Commission
West Virginia Division of Financial Institutions
West Virginia Insurance Commission
West Virginia Lottery Commission
West Virginia Municipal Bond Commission
West Virginia Office of Tax Appeals
West Virginia Racing Commission
West Virginia State Budget Office
West Virginia State Tax Department
West Virginia Department of Transportation
West Virginia Division of Highways
West Virginia Division of Motor Vehicles
West Virginia Division of Public Transit
West Virginia State Rail Authority
West Virginia Parkways Authority
West Virginia Public Port Authority
 West Virginia Department of Tourism

West Virginia State Treasurer

External links 
State of West Virginia government website

 
State Agencies
Lists of government agencies in the United States